Taueve Ugapo is a former Samoan rugby union player who played as wing.

Career
His first international cap for Samoa was during the match against Tonga, in Apia, on 28 May 1988. He was one of the members of the Samoan squad who toured Wales and Britain in 1988. His last international cap was against Belgium, in Brussels, on 3 October 1989.

Notes

External links
Tauvere Ugapo international stats

Year of birth missing (living people)
Place of birth missing (living people)
Living people
Samoan rugby union players
Rugby union wings
Samoa international rugby union players